Trochoidea pyramidata  is a species of air-breathing land snail, a terrestrial pulmonate gastropod mollusk in the family Geomitridae, the hairy snails and their allies.

Distribution

This species occurs around the Mediterranean Sea.

References

 Bank, R. A.; Neubert, E. (2017). Checklist of the land and freshwater Gastropoda of Europe. Last update: July 16th, 2017

External links
 Draparnaud, J.-P.-R. (1805). Histoire naturelle des mollusques terrestres et fluviatiles de la France. 2 pp. (Avertissement a sa Majesté l'Impératrice), 2 pp. Rapport, i-viii (Préface), 1-164, pl. 1-13, 1 p. Errata.
 Mousson, A. (1859). Coquilles terrestres et fluviatiles, recueillies dans l'Orient par M. le Dr. Alex. Schläfli. Vierteljahrsschrift der Naturforschenden Gesellschaft in Zürich, 4 (1): 12-36; 4 (3): 253-297. Zürich
 Walderdorff R. (1864). Systematisches Verzeichnis der im Kreise Cattaro (Süd-Dalmatien) mit Ausnahme der Biela-Gora und in einigen angrenzenden Theilen von Montenegro und türkisch Albanien vorkommenden Land- und Süsswasser-Mollusken. Verhandlungen der Kaiserlich-Königlichen Zoologisch-Botanischen Gesellschaft in Wien. 14: 503‑514

Trochoidea (genus)
Gastropods described in 1805